The consequence argument is an argument against compatibilism popularised by Peter van Inwagen. The argument claims that if agents have no control over the facts of the past then the agent has no control of the consequences of those facts. 

The Stanford Encyclopedia of Philosophy gives the following version of the argument, in the form of a syllogism:

No one has power over the facts of the past and the laws of nature.
No one has power over the fact that the facts of the past and the laws of nature entail every fact of the future (i.e., determinism is true)
Therefore, no one has power over the facts of the future.

Or in van Inwagan's own words, in An Essay on Free Will:

If determinism is true, then our acts are the consequence of laws of nature and events in the remote past. But it's not up to us what went on before we were born, and neither is it up to us what the laws of nature are. Therefore, the consequences of these things (including our present acts) are not up to us (p. 56).

References

Free will
Philosophical arguments
Concepts in metaphysics